A philatelic auction, or stamp auction is a sale of stamps, covers and other philatelic material usually run by stamp dealers or specialist collectibles auctioneers, such as, David Feldman, Christie's and Sotheby's, where prospective purchasers place bids in an attempt to obtain the desired items.

The highest bidder for each lot (described item or items) makes the purchase. Auctions are generally divided into mail sales, where bids are accepted by mail, and public sales, where mail bids are combined with live bidding from individuals present at the auction or participating by telephone.

Auctions usually allow prospective purchasers to view the items beforehand, either in a catalogue, in the auction house, or both.

See also

 Mystic Stamp Company
 Philatelic investment
 Robson Lowe
 Stanley Gibbons

References

Further reading
 Browning, Peter. Fell's international directory of stamp-auction houses. New York: F. Fell Publishers, 1982  316p.
 The stamp auction directory and collectors guide: the collectors guide to buying and selling stamps and covers at auction. Durham, N. C.: Droege Computing Services, 1993 177p.

External links

 At the auction, you get to name your price Linn's Stamp News

 Philatelic
Philatelic terminology
Contexts for auctions